The People's Liberation Movement was a political party in Saint Vincent and the Grenadines. It contested the 1957 general elections, receiving 15.2% of the vote and winning a single seat. It did not contest any further elections.

References

Political parties in Saint Vincent and the Grenadines